The 2011–12 Biathlon World Cup – World Cup 1 is the opening event of the season and is held in Östersund, Sweden, from 30 November until 4 December 2011.

Schedule of events 
The time schedule of the event stands below

Medal winners

Men

Women

Achievements

 Best performance for all time

 , 10th place in Individual
 , 83rd place in Individual
 , 84th place in Individual and 83rd place in Sprint
 , 5th place in Sprint
 , 10th place in Sprint
 , 17th place in Sprint
 , 23rd place in Sprint
 , 29th place in Sprint
 , 37th place in Sprint
 , 53rd place in Sprint
 , 80th place in Sprint
 , 89th place in Sprint
 , 3rd place in Pursuit
 , 2nd place in Individual
 , 5th place in Individual
 , 13th place in Individual and 4th place in Sprint
 , 21st place in Individual
 , 26th place in Individual
 , 28th place in Individual
 , 32nd place in Individual, 20th place in Sprint and 12th in Pursuit
 , 38th place in Individual
 , 51st place in Individual
 , 55th place in Individual
 , 69th place in Individual
 , 72nd place in Individual
 , 78th place in Individual and 71st in Sprint
 , 83rd place in Individual
 , 28th place in Sprint
 , 35th place in Sprint
 , 52nd place in Sprint
 , 33rd place in Pursuit

 First World Cup race

 , 37th place in Individual
 , 42nd place in Individual
 , 73rd place in Individual
 , 94th place in Individual
 , 101st place in Individual
 , 92nd place in Sprint
 , 102nd place in Sprint
 , 6th place in Individual
 , 45th place in Individual
 , 56th place in Individual
 , 80th place in Individual
 , 81st place in Sprint
 , 82nd place in Sprint
 , 84th place in Sprint
 , 93rd place in Sprint

References 

- World Cup 1, 2011-12 Biathlon World Cup
Biathlon World Cup - World Cup 1, 2011-12
November 2011 sports events in Europe
December 2011 sports events in Europe
Sports competitions in Östersund
Biathlon competitions in Sweden